The Swedish Program for ICT in Development Regions (SPIDER) is an ICT4D non governmental organization based in Sweden. SPIDER's vision is "an interconnected world where Information and Communication Technology enables everyone to have their voices heard and their needs met". SPIDER's mission is to support the use of Information and Communication Technology to improve accountability, education and health in developing regions. SPIDER establishes collaborations, shares knowledge and builds capacity through networks globally.

The organization has acted as an ICT4D central node in a network of actors from academia, civil society, government and business in Sweden and abroad for more than 10 years. SPIDER facilitates the collaboration and sharing of experience between different actors in the field to reach better development results. Through its initiatives, the organization has supported many projects and organization in different least developed countries including:
 ICT4Democracy in East Africa Network
 ICT4D Cambodia Network
 The International Network for Postgraduate Students in the area of ICT4D (IPID)

SPIDER is hosted by the Department for Computer and Systems Sciences (DSV) at Stockholm University and funded by the Swedish International Development Agency (Sida) with complementary funding from Stockholm University.

Information and communication technologies for development
Aid
Non-profit organizations based in Sweden